Victory Medal may refer to:

World War I
 1914–1918 Inter-Allied Victory medal (France)
 Allied Victory Medal (Italy)
 Victory Medal 1914–1918 (Belgium)
 Inter-Allied Victory Medal (Greece)
 Victory Medal (Japan)
 Victory Medal (Romania)
 Victory Medal (South Africa)
 Victory Medal (United Kingdom)
 World War I Victory Medal (United States)

World War II
 World War II Victory Medal (United States)
 Merchant Marine World War II Victory Medal, United States

Others
 Cold War Victory Medal, United States National Guard

See also